This article serves as an index – as complete as possible – of all the honorific orders or similar decorations awarded by Perak, classified by Monarchies chapter and Republics chapter, and, under each chapter, recipients' countries and the detailed list of recipients.

Awards

Monarchies

Perak Royal Family 
They have been awarded :

 Abduljalilian Branch
 Tuanku Bainun  :
  Recipient of the Royal Family Order of Perak (DK) 
  Member First Class of the Azlanii Royal Family Order (DKA I, 2010) 
 Sultan Perak Raja Nazrin Shah :
  Recipient of the Royal Family Order of Perak (DK ) 
  Superior Class of the Perak Family Order of Sultan Azlan Shah (DKSA, 18.4.2005) 
  Member First Class of the Azlanii Royal Family Order (DKA I) 
  Grand Knight of the Order of Cura Si Manja Kini (SPCM, 19.4.1986), with title Dato' Sri —currently : 
  Knight Grand Commander of the Order of Taming Sari (SPTS, 19.4.1989) with title Dato' Sri Panglima
  Knight Grand Commander of the Order of the Perak State Crown (SPMP) with title Dato' Sri
 Raja Permaisuri Perak Zara Salim Davidson :
  Superior Class of the Perak Family Order of Sultan Azlan Shah (18/05/2007  )
  Member First Class of the Azlanii Royal Family Order
 Raja Azureen, the sultan's eldest daughter 
  Grand Knight of the Order of Cura Si Manja Kini (SPCMS, 19.4.1988), with title Dato' Sri — currently : 
 Her husband, Y.Bhg. Dato’ Sri Muhammad Saleh bin Dato’ Muhammad Ismail
  Grand Knight of the Order of Cura Si Manja Kini (SPCM, 19.4.1988), with title Dato' Sri — currently : 
 Noraini Jane of Perak 
  Member Second Class of the Azlanii Royal Family Order (DKA II) 
  Grand Knight of the Order of Cura Si Manja Kini (SPCMS, 19.4.1992), with title Dato' Sri — currently : 
 His son, Raja Ahmad Nazim Azlan Shah, Raja Kechil Sulong
  Member Second Class of the Azlanii Royal Family Order (DKA II, 24.4.2010), with title Dato' Sri
 Raja Eleena, the sultan's second daughter 
  Grand Knight of the Order of Cura Si Manja Kini (SPCM, 19.4.1989), with title Dato' Sri — currently : 
 Her husband, Y.Bhg. Datuk Sri Ismail Farouk bin ‘Abdu’llah
  Grand Knight of the Order of Cura Si Manja Kini (SPCM), with title Dato' Sri — currently : 
 Raja Yong Sofia, the sultan's youngest daughter 
  Grand Knight of the Order of Cura Si Manja Kini (SPCM, 19.4.1989), title : Dato' Sri—currently : 
Her husband, Tunku Kamil of Kedah 
  Grand Knight of the Order of Cura Si Manja Kini (SPCM, 19.4.1989), title : Dato' Sri—currently : 

 Iskandarian Branch

 Jaafarian Branch

STATES of MALAYSIA

Johor Royal Family 
They have been awarded :

 Sultan Ibrahim Ismail of Johor :
  Recipient of the Royal Family Order of Perak (DK) 
 Permaisuri Raja Zarith Sofia :
  Recipient of the Royal Family Order of Perak (DK, 21.05.2012)   
  Grand Knight of the Order of Cura Si Manja Kini (the Perak Sword of State, SPCM) with title Dato' Sri

Kedah Royal Family 
 Sultan Sallehuddin of Kedah 
  Recipient of the Royal Family Order of Perak (DK, 5.1986) -- currently :

Kelantan Royal Family 
They have been awarded:

 Muhammad V of Kelantan, Sultan of Kelantan (since 13 September 2010) :
  Recipient of the Royal Family Order of Perak (DK)
 Ismail Petra of Kelantan, Sultan Muhammad V of Kelantan's father and retired Sultan for illness :
  Recipient of the Royal Family Order of Perak (DK)

Negeri Sembilan Royal Family 
 Muhriz of Negeri Sembilan : 
  Recipient of the Royal Family Order of Perak (DK, 5.3.2009)

Pahang Royal Family 
 Ahmad Shah of Pahang :
  Recipient of the Royal Family Order of Perak (DK, 6.5.1975) -- currently : 
  Grand Knight of the Order of Cura Si Manja Kini (the Perak Sword of State, SPCM) with title Dato' Sri—currently :

Perlis Royal Family 
 Tuanku Sirajuddin of Perlis :
  Recipient of the Royal Family Order of Perak (DK)
  Grand Knight of the Order of Cura Si Manja Kini (the Perak Sword of State, SPCM) with title Dato' Sri

Selangor Royal Family 
 Sharafuddin of Selangor :
  Recipient of the Royal Family Order of Perak (DK)

Terengganu Royal Family 
 Sultan Mizan Zainal Abidin of Terengganu (Sultan, since 15 May 1998 - Y.d-P.A., 12/2006-12/2011):
  Recipient of the Royal Family Order of Perak (DK)

to be completed ...

 ASIAN MONARCHIES

Brunei Royal Family 
See also List of Malaysian Honours awarded to Heads of State and Royals

They have been awarded :
 Hassanal Bolkiah : 
  Recipient of the Royal Family Order of Perak (DK, 7.8.1988) -- currently : 
 Mohamed Bolkiah, sultan's brother : 
  Grand Knight (Dato' Seri) of the Order of Cura Si Manja Kini (the Perak Sword of State, SPCM) with title Dato' Sri

to be completed ...

 EUROPEAN MONARCHIES

to be completed ...

Former Monarchies 

to be completed ...

Republics 

to be completed

See also 
 Mirror page : List of honours of the Perak Royal Family by country

References 

 
Perak